Richard Wendell Morton (born September 21, 1956) is an American professional wrestler, currently performing on the independent circuit. He is the current GCW Television Champion, after pinning Matt Cardona at GCW Say You Will. For most of his career, Morton has performed with Robert Gibson as The Rock N' Roll Express, described as "the consummate baby face tag team". Morton has wrestled for multiple promotions in the United States including the Continental Wrestling Association, Mid-South Wrestling, Jim Crockett Promotions, World Championship Wrestling, Smoky Mountain Wrestling, the World Wrestling Federation, and Extreme Championship Wrestling, as well as the Japanese promotions All Japan Pro Wrestling, New Japan Pro-Wrestling, and Wrestle Association R.

Morton has held dozens of championships throughout his career, including the NWA World Junior Heavyweight Championship, NWA World Tag Team Championship, USWA Unified World Heavyweight Championship, USWA World Tag Team Championship, and WCW World Six-Man Tag Team Championship. He has been inducted into the NWA Hall of Fame, Wrestling Observer Newsletter Hall of Fame, and WWE Hall of Fame. His skill at driving audiences into a sympathetic frenzy by convincingly selling pain gave rise to the expression "playing Ricky Morton".

Professional wrestling career

Continental Wrestling Association (1977–1985) 
Morton was trained by his father, Paul, and by veteran wrestler Ken Lucas. He debuted in 1978, facing Ken Wayne in his debut match. He wrestled primarily for the Continental Wrestling Association in Memphis, Tennessee, often teaming with Lucas or Eddie Gilbert. Morton quickly became a popular performer thanks to his "athletic prowess", "sensational looks", and "spiky blond mullet". His popularity with female fans saw him dubbed a "teen idol".

In early 1983, promoters Jerry Jarrett and Jerry Lawler paired Morton with Robert Gibson as The Rock 'n' Roll Express in an attempt to replicate the popularity of The Fabulous Ones. They won the Mid-South Tag Team Title three times and feuded with the team that would become their archrivals, The Midnight Express of Bobby Eaton and Dennis Condrey. Because of his small stature and good looks, he was usually made the "Face in Peril", meaning he would be the one to take most of the punishment in the matches to get the fans behind the team.  He was also the one that always suffered a humiliation or "injury" to further the storyline the team would be involved in. Nowadays, this is sometimes referred to as "Playing Ricky Morton". At this time they also teamed in Joe Blanchard's South West wrestling territory feuding with The Grapplers.

In 1984, Morton took part in a high-profile angle with Randy Savage which saw Savage piledrive him through a table at ringside.

NWA Tri-State / Mid-South Wrestling (1981, 1984–1986, 1987) 
In 1981, Morton began wrestling for NWA Tri-State. He formed a tag team with Eddie Gilbert, winning the NWA Tri-State Tag Team Championship twice. His second reign ended in August 1981 when he left the promotion.

In 1984, Morton and Gibson began wrestling regularly for Mid-South Wrestling, the successor to NWA Tri-State. They won the Mid-South Tag Team Championship three times during 1984, trading the titles with The Midnight Express. Their third and final reign lasted until March 1985, when they lost to Steve Williams and Ted DiBiase. They continued to appear with Mid-South Wrestling until June 1985.

Morton and Gibson reappeared with Mid-South Wrestling, by then renamed the Universal Wrestling Federation, throughout 1986. At the "Superdome Extravaganza" supercard in the Louisiana Superdome in June 1986, Morton unsuccessfully challenged Ric Flair for the NWA World Heavyweight Championship.

Jim Crockett Promotions (1985–1988) 

In 1985, both teams moved on to the NWA's Jim Crockett Promotions and became famous due to the national television exposure of TBS. Ricky and Robert had a major feud with the "Russians", Ivan and Nikita Koloff and won the NWA World Tag Team Title. They traded the title again with the Russians and lost them to their hated rivals the Midnight Express on February 2, 1986 during Superstars on the Superstation due to their manager, Jim Cornette. Cornette used his tennis racket on Robert to help his team win.

Fearing that his self-proclaimed sex appeal with women was being threatened by Morton, NWA Champion Ric Flair began a feud with Morton in 1986. In the spring of that year, Morton was having an interview at ringside when Flair came onto the set and insulted Morton's fans (who consisted mostly of tween girls) by calling them "teenyboppers in their training bras." He gave Morton a training bra as a "gift from one of Flair's girlfriends" and told Morton that he couldn't handle real, grown-up women. In response, Morton stomped on Flair's sunglasses. This led to a fight and then a series of matches, the most notable being their Steel Cage match at the 1986 Great American Bash. To help build Morton as a serious title contender, it was pointed out that he once went to a one-hour draw with then-AWA Champion Nick Bockwinkel. Morton never won the title but he proved that he was of the same caliber as Flair was in the ring. At one point in the feud with Flair, after a six-man tag team elimination match in which Morton pinned Flair to become the winner, Flair and the other three Four Horsemen invaded the Rock 'n' Roll Express' dressing room and attacked Morton, rubbing his face on the concrete floor, causing a grotesque-looking facial injury. They also broke his nose in another attack. Horsemen member Arn Anderson would also make fun of Morton, calling him "Punky Morton," which was a play on the popular 1980s sitcom Punky Brewster. The term used to belittle Morton backfired when fans began to use it as a term of endearment. Morton and Gibson won the title back from the Midnight Express and feuded with Ole and Arn Anderson for the rest of the year. They culminated this feud with a win over the Andersons in a cage match at Starrcade on November 28. This victory started the Horsemen's dissatisfaction with Ole, who was kicked out of the stable just months later. Morton and Gibson then lost the title to Rick Rude and Manny Fernandez on December 6, 1986, whom they feuded with from December 1986 to June 1987. When Rude left for the World Wrestling Federation, the title was given back to the Rock & Roll Express, with the explanation that they won the title accompanied by footage of a prior non-title match won by the Rock & Roll Express where they pinned the champions.

Morton and Gibson then feuded briefly with the New Breed, Sean Royal and Chris Champion, but this feud ended when the New Breed were injured in an auto accident. Their next feud was with Arn Anderson and Tully Blanchard, who won the title from them on September 29, 1987 after Jim Cornette's new Midnight Express of Bobby Eaton and Stan Lane attacked them and injured Morton's arm and shoulder. Morton came out in the middle of the match and blindly tagged Gibson and courageously tried to wrestle but the Horsemen soon took advantage and Gibson gave up the match to save Morton more pain. They feuded for a few months with the Horsemen keeping the titles by getting themselves disqualified, and injuring Gibson's ribs.

All Japan Pro Wrestling (1988) 
In May 1988, Morton and Gibson toured Japan with All Japan Pro Wrestling, competing in the Super Power Series and facing teams including Samson Fuyuki and Toshiaki Kawada, Shinichi Nakano and Tiger Mask, and Isamu Teranishi and Masanobu Fuchi. They returned for a second tour in October 1988, this time competing in the October Giant Series. In the final match of their tour they unsuccessfully challenged Fuyuki and Kawada for the All Asia Tag Team Championship.

United States Wrestling Association (1989) 
In 1989, Morton and Gibson went to United States Wrestling Association were they feuded with Wildside (Chris Champion and Mark Starr) and The Blackbirds, King Parsons and Action Jackson. Later that year he teamed with his cousin, Todd Morton and won the CWA Tag team titles.

World Championship Wrestling (1990–1993)
They returned to World Championship Wrestling in 1990. Gibson injured his knee and Morton teamed with Big Josh and Junkyard Dog to win the WCW World Six-Man Tag Team Championship.

On June 12, 1991, at Clash of the Champions XV, Morton was in the ring to accept an invitation by Alexandra York to join her York Foundation. Gibson appeared and said he was healthy and ready to go and to everybody's shock, Morton turned on Gibson and beat him down before leaving with York, Mr. Hughes and Terrence Taylor. He changed his name to Richard Morton and they soon added Tommy Rich, who became Thomas Rich. They feuded with Gibson, Dustin Rhodes and Bobby Eaton and won the WCW World Six-Man Tag Team Title. At The Great American Bash in July 1991, Morton defeated Gibson. In October 1991 at Halloween Havoc, Morton lost to Flyin' Brian in a bout for the newly created WCW Light Heavyweight Championship.

They disbanded in early 1992 and Morton was used as a preliminary heel jobber where he teamed with various heels like Diamond Dallas Page. Morton made his last WCW TV appearance in a match against Barry Windham on July 18, 1992.

Morton and Gibson returned to World Championship Wrestling in January 1993 feuding with The Heavenly Bodies. They appeared at SuperBrawl III and defeated Heavenly Bodies.

Smoky Mountain Wrestling (1992–1995) 
In 1992, Morton joined Smoky Mountain Wrestling and reformed the Rock & Roll Express with Gibson on August 8, 1992 during a match in Johnson City, Tennessee. They went back and forth to the two promotions. They feuded with two versions of The Heavenly Bodies for the next year and a half, Stan Lane and Tom Prichard, and Prichard and Jimmy Del Ray. They feuded with The Gangstas (New Jack and Mustafa Saed) in 1994 and went to the NWA to win the Tag Title again in 1995. During 1995 he also teamed briefly with David Jericho. Later that year, he reunited with Gibson and they feuded with PG-13. Both Morton and Gibson left USWA in 1996.

World Wrestling Federation (1993, 1994) 
In 1993, Morton and Gibson debuted in the World Wrestling Federation on the September 27, 1993, episode of Monday Night Raw, defeating Barry Hardy and Duane Gill. Recognized on WWF television as the SMW Tag Team Champions, they went on to defend the championship in bouts on WWF All American Wrestling and WWF Superstars. At Survivor Series on November 24, 1993, they lost the championship to The Heavenly Bodies (Tom Prichard and Jimmy Del Ray), leaving the WWF thereafter.

Morton and Gibson briefly returned to the WWF in July 1994, joining the WWF Summer Fest tour of Germany and losing a series of matches to The Smoking Gunns.

Wrestle Association R (1993, 1994) 
In July 1993, Morton and Gibson toured Japan with Wrestle Association R, facing Último Dragón and Yuji Yasuraoka in a series of bouts. They returned for a second tour in November 1994 as part of the WAR-ISM 1994 event, facing members of Fuyuki-Gun on several occasions.

World Championship Wrestling (1996) 
Morton and Gibson returned to World Championship Wrestling on the June 3, 1996 episode of WCW Monday Nitro. They briefly feuded with The Four Horsemen. They remained with the promotion until October 1996.

Frontier Martial-Arts Wrestling (1996, 1997) 
In May 1996, Morton and Gibson wrestled four bouts for the Japanese promotion Frontier Martial-Arts Wrestling (FMW). At the FMW 7th Anniversary Show in Kawasaki Stadium, Morton, Gibson and Ricky Fuji defeated Boogie Man, Crypt Keeper, and Freddy Krueger in a six-man tag team bout.

Morton returned for a second tour with FMW in April 1997, participating in the "Fighting Creation" tournament as part of a three-man team with Fuji and Hayabusa. At the FMW 8th Anniversary Show in Yokohama Arena, he and Fuji defeated Dragon Winger and Hido. Morton returned once more in August 1997, teaming with Fuji in the "Super Dynamism" tournament. During the tournament, Morton, Fuji, and Jinsei Shinzaki lost to Mr. Gannosuke, The Gladiator, and Super Leather in a "no ropes barbed wire street fight".

Extreme Championship Wrestling (1997) 
Morton debuted in the Philadelphia, Pennsylvania-based promotion Extreme Championship Wrestling at ECW House Party 1997 on January 11, 1997. He teamed with Tommy Rich in a loss to The Gangstas; following the bout, Morton and Rich faced one another in an impromptu match that was won by Rich. He returned to ECW the following month at Crossing the Line Again, losing to Big Stevie Cool.

World Wrestling Federation (1998) 
In January 1998, both Ricky Morton and Robert Gibson returned to WWF as part of the "NWA" angle as the NWA Tag Team Champions. They lost the titles to The Headbangers on February 17 episode of Raw Is War. They competed at WrestleMania XIV for the tag team battle royal won by The Legion of Doom. In the spring they feuded with the NWA Tag Team Champions New Midnight Express Bart Gunn and Bob Holly. This took them to their match at Unforgiven: In Your House which Gunn and Holly won.

Independent circuit (1998–2003) 
After leaving WWF in May 1998, they went to work for Ohio Valley Wrestling and Power Pro Wrestling until 1999. Morton then appeared on Juggalo Championship Wrestling's JCW Vol. 1 in a battle royal.

On September 7, 2002 he defeated his former rival Bobby Eaton at Ultimate Championship wrestling.

NWA Total Nonstop Action (2003) 
In 2003, they briefly were part of Vince Russo's S.E.X. group in Total Nonstop Action Wrestling (TNA). They feuded with America's Most Wanted. Morton lost to Kid Kash on July 30.

Late career (2003–present) 

Since leaving TNA, Morton wrestles all over the independent circuit in the Southeast and on the East Coast and often wins regional titles. Occasionally, he teams with Gibson as the Rock 'N Roll Express. In 2003/2004, he, along with Robert Gibson, joined the All World Wrestling league/Big Time Wrestling. On March 31, 2007 in Logan, West Virginia, Morton defeated Bobby Eaton in an NWA Legends Match during ASW's Rumble In The Jungle show. On April 27, 2007 in Memphis, Tennessee at the PMG Clash of Legends event put on by Memphis Wrestling, Morton and Kid Kash captured the MW Southern Tag Team Championship, defeating Too Cool II. On June 30, 2007 The Rock & Roll Express (Ricky and Todd Morton) beat Big and Tasty (Sweet William Valentine and Playboy Mike Trusty) to win the AWA Supreme Tag Team titles. On October 24, 2007 The Rock & Roll Express lost the AWA Supreme Tag Team Titles to Chaos Theory (Khris Kaliber and Karma). On January 4, 2014, Morton defeated Chase Owens to win the NWA World Junior Heavyweight Championship. He re-lost the title to Owens on March 7.

In 2014, Morton opened a wrestling school (The School of Morton) in Chuckey, Tennessee.

In 2016, The Rock N' Roll Express made a special appearance as part of TNA's weekly televised program Impact Wrestlings Total Nonstop Deletion episode, where they took part in the Tag Team Apocalypto match along with other tag teams.

In 2017, The Rock N' Roll Express were inducted into the WWE Hall of Fame.

The team made their New Japan Pro-Wrestling debut during the Fighting Spirit Unleashed 2019 event, 3 events promoted by NJPW in the United States.

In 2019, Morton and Gibson wrestled three bouts for New Japan Pro-Wrestling and also appeared in All Elite Wrestling.

The Rock N Roll Express participated in the 2019 edition of the Jim Crockett Cup, but were defeated by The Briscoe Brothers in the first round. During the NWA television tapings on October 1, 2019, they won the NWA World Tag Team Championship. In January 2020, Morton entered a rivalry with Nick Aldis, leading to a Heavyweight Championship match on NWA Powerrr which Morton lost.

Other media
Morton made his WWE video game debut as DLC for WWE 2K18 along with Robert Gibson.

 Personal life 
Morton's father, Paul, was a professional wrestling referee. His cousin Todd Morton also wrestled, occasionally teaming with Morton.

Morton was arrested in October 2005 for failing to pay child support. Morton contended that the outstanding payments were due to the child support amount having been set when he was earning a significant income working for major promotions as a part of The Rock N' Roll Express, and failed to reflect the much lower amount he was able to earn on the independent circuit. At least two benefit shows were put together in February 2006 to raise money towards his legal fees. A United Wrestling Association show in Alcoa, Tennessee on February 2, 2006, raised $2,475 for this cause. On February 15, 2006, Morton was released under the condition that he continue working and making efforts to catch up on the delinquent payments owed to his ex-wife. He returned to the ring the next night for the United Wrestling Association. In September 2007, while camping with his children at a Tennessee park, Morton was rearrested on the same charges. It was estimated he owed a remaining balance of $63,000. A website was established, and raised enough funds to secure his bail.

Morton currently operates School of Morton in Chuckey, Tennessee, where he lends his ring experience to all his students. He also still works the independent circuit and cameos in several films and videos.

 Championships and accomplishments 304 Wrestling304 Championship (1 time)3XW Wrestling3XW Tag Team Championships (1 time)  with Kerry MortonAppalachian Mountain WrestlingAMW Tag Team Championship (1 time)All Star Wrestling (Virginia)ASW Heavyweight Championship (1 time)
ASW Southern Heavyweight Championship (1 time)
ASW Tag Team Championship (1 time) – with Robert GibsonAll Star Wrestling (West Virginia)ASW Legends Championship (1 time)Allied Independent Wrestling FederationsAIWF World Heavyweight Championship (1 time)
AIWF United States Championship (1 time)
AIWF All Star Champion (1 Time)
 AIWF Hall Of Fame (Class Of 2015) Alternative Championship WrestlingACW Heavyweight Championship (2 times)American Pro WrestlingAPW Heavyweight Championship (1 time)AWA SupremeAWA Supreme Tag Team Championship (1 time) – with Todd MortonAppalachia Mountain WrestlingAMW Heavyweight Championship (1 time)Appalachia Pro WrestlingAPW Heavyweight Championship (1 time)Carolina Wrestling AssociationCWA Heavyweight Championship (1 time)Cauliflower Alley ClubTag Team Award (2022) – with Robert GibsonChampionship WrestlingCW Triple Crown Tag Team Championship (1 time) – with Wayne AdkinsContinental Wrestling Association / Championship Wrestling AssociationAWA Southern Tag Team Championship (8 times) – with Sonny King (1), with Ken Lucas (4), Eddie Gilbert (1), and Robert Gibson (2)
CWA Heavyweight Championship (1 time)
CWA Tag Team Championship (2 times) – with Robert Gibson (1), and Todd Morton (1)
CWA World Tag Team Championship (1 time) – with Robert GibsonExodus Wrestling AllianceEWA Heavyweight Championship (5 times)Extreme Wrestling FederationEWF Heavyweight Championship (1 time)
EWF Tag Team Championship (1 time) – with Chris HamrickGreat American Wrestling FederationGAWF Tag Team Championship (1 time) – with David JerichoJoe Cazana PromotionsJCP Tag Team Championship (1 time, current) – with Kerry MortonJim Crockett Promotions / World Championship WrestlingNWA World Tag Team Championship (Mid-Atlantic version) (4 times) – with Robert Gibson
WCW World Six-Man Tag Team Championship (2 times) – with Thomas Rich and Junkyard Dog (1), and Terrence Taylor and Thomas Rich (1)Korean Pro-Wrestling AssociationNWA World Tag Team Championship (1 time) – with Robert GibsonMemphis WrestlingMemphis Wrestling Southern Tag Team Championship (1 time) – with Kid KashMid-South WrestlingMid-South Tag Team Championship (3 times) – with Robert GibsonMid-South Wrestling AssociationMSWA Tennessee Heavyweight Championship (1 time)
MSWA Southern Tag Team Championship (1 time) – with Robert GibsonNational Wrestling AllianceNWA World Junior Heavyweight Championship (1 time)
NWA World Tag Team Championship (3 times) – with Robert Gibson1
NWA World Tag Team Championship Tournament (1995)
The Anderson Brothers Classic 5 Tournament (2011)
NWA Hall of Fame (Class of 2006)NWA Mid-AmericaNWA Mid-America Tag Team Championship (1 time) – with Ken LucasNWA Mid Atlantic Championship WrestlingMACW Tag Team Championship (4 times) – with Robert Gibson (3) and Brad Armstrong (1)NWA Rocky TopNWA Rocky Top Tag Team Championship (1 time) – with Brad ArmstrongNWA Smoky Mountain WrestlingSmoky Mountain Cup (2013)NWA SouthwestNWA World Tag Team Championship (1 time) – with Robert GibsonNWA TexasNWA Top of Texas Tag Team Championship (1 time) – with PhoenixNWA Tri-StateNWA Tri-State Tag Team Championship (2 times) – with Eddie GilbertNWA WildsideNWA Wildside Tag Team Championship (1 time) – with Robert GibsonNorth American Championship WrestlingNACW Tag Team Championship (2 times) – with Buff BagwellNorth Carolina Wrestling Association10th Annual Ivan Koloff Tag Team Tournament (2018) – with Chase Stevens Omni Pro WrestlingOPW Rock 'n' Roll Cup Tag Team Tournament (2006) – with Aaron ArmorPeach State WrestlingPSW Cordele City Heavyweight Championship (1 time)Pro Wrestling IllustratedTag Team of the Year (1986) – with Robert Gibson
 Ranked No. 56 of the top 500 singles wrestlers in the PWI 500 in 1991
Ranked No. 95 of the top 500 singles wrestlers of the "PWI Years" in 2003
Ranked No. 4 of the Top 100 Tag Teams of the "PWI Years" with Robert Gibson in 2003Professional Wrestling FederationPWF Heavyweight Championship (1 time)Professional Wrestling Hall of Fame and MuseumClass of 2021 – Inducted as a member of The Rock 'N' Roll ExpressRenegade Wrestling AllianceRWA Tag Team Championship (1 time, current) - with Robert Gibson Smoky Mountain WrestlingSMW Tag Team Championship (10 times) – with Robert GibsonSouthern Michigan Championship WrestlingSMCW United States Heavyweight Championship (1 time)Southern States WrestlingSSW Texas Heavyweight Championship (1 time)
SSW Tag Team Championship (3 times) – with Bobby Fulton (1), Beau James (1), and Ricky Harrison (1)Southwest Championship WrestlingSCW Southwest Tag Team Championship (3 times) – with Ken Lucas (2) and Eddie Gilbert (1)Supreme Championship WrestlingSCW Hall of Fame (Class of 2009)Total Combat WrestlingTCW Tag Team Championship (1 time) – with Robert Gibson Traditional Championship WrestlingTCW World Tag Team Championship (2 time) – with Dustin Heritage (1) and Robert Gibson (1)Ultimate Championship WrestlingUCW Heavyweight Championship (2 times)
UCW Tag Team Championship (1 time) – with Robert GibsonUnited States Wrestling AssociationUSWA Unified World Heavyweight Championship (1 time)
USWA World Tag Team Championship (2 times) – with Robert GibsonUnited Wrestling AssociationUWA Texas Heavyweight Championship (1 time)
UWA United States Championship (1 time)
UWA Southern Heavyweight Champion (1 time)	UPW Pro WrestlingUPW Tag Team Championship (1 time, current)Viral Pro WrestlingVPW Tag Team Championship (2 times) – with Robert GibsonVirginia Championship WrestlingVCW Championship (1 time)Virginia Wrestling AssociationVWA/CCW Heavyweight Championship (1 time)World Organization of WrestlingWOW Tag Team Championship (1 time) – with Robert GibsonWrestling Observer Newsletter''Wrestling Observer Newsletter Hall of Fame (Class of 2014) – with Robert GibsonWWE WWE Hall of Fame (Class of 2017 — with Robert Gibson)Xtreme Maximum Championship Wrestling'''
XMCW Legends And Superstars Championship (1 time)
XMCW Tag Team Championship (1 time) – with Tommy Gibson
1One of their reigns with the title began in Memphis, Tennessee, though the records are unclear as to which promotion hosted the card. During another reign, the championship was awarded to them, though there's no indication of where the titles were awarded nor which promotion they were wrestling for at the time.

References

External links 
 
 
 
 

1956 births
20th-century professional wrestlers
21st-century professional wrestlers
American male professional wrestlers
Living people
People from Nashville, Tennessee
Professional Wrestling Hall of Fame and Museum
Professional wrestlers from Tennessee
USWA Unified World Heavyweight Champions
WWE Hall of Fame inductees
NWA World Junior Heavyweight Champions
NWA World Tag Team Champions
WCW World Tag Team Champions
NWA Georgia Tag Team Champions